Yameisi Borlot Simón (also Yaneisi or Yaimeisi; born 18 February 1991 in Santiago de Cuba) is a Cuban sprinter. She competed in the 4 × 400 m relay event at the 2012 Summer Olympics.

Personal bests
200 m: 24.06 s (wind: +2.0 m/s) –  Barquisimeto, 29 July 2011
400 m: 52.49 s –  La Habana, 29 June 2012

Achievements

References

External links

Sports reference biography

Sportspeople from Santiago de Cuba
Cuban female sprinters
1991 births
Living people
Olympic athletes of Cuba
Athletes (track and field) at the 2012 Summer Olympics
Central American and Caribbean Games medalists in athletics
21st-century Cuban women